The 62nd edition of Omloop Het volk cycling event was held on 3 March 2007. The race was won by Italian rider Filippo Pozzato in a five-man sprint before Juan Antonio Flecha and Tom Boonen. It was ranked a 1.HC event of the 2006–07 UCI Europe Tour. The edition marked the last time the race finished in Lokeren before it moved back to Ghent.

Results

External links

References

2007
Omloop Het Nieuwsblad
Omloop Het Nieuwsblad
Omloop Het Nieuwsblad